The Diocese of Ciudad Quesada is a Latin Church ecclesiastical territory or diocese of the Catholic Church in Costa Rica. It is a suffragan diocese in the ecclesiastical province of the metropolitan Archdiocese of San José de Costa Rica. the episcopal see is Ciudad Quesada (or, more simply, Quesada; alternatively known as San Carlos). Ciudad Quesada is the capital of the District of Ciudad Quesada, and of the larger Canton of San Carlos, which is in turn part of Alajuela Province. The diocese was erected on 25 July 1995.

On 31 December 2012, Pope Benedict XVI accepted the resignation of Bishop Oswaldo Brenes Álvarez from the pastoral governance of the diocese; there was no immediate replacement, so the diocese was a sede vacante (vacant see).

Bishops
Angel San Casimiro Fernández, O.A.R. (1995–2007), appointed Bishop of Alajuela
Oswaldo Brenes Álvarez (2008–2012)
José Manuel Garita Herrera (2014– )

See also 
Catholic Church in Costa Rica

References

External links
Official website
 

Ciudad Quesada
Ciudad Quesada
Ciudad Quesada